Queen Rock Montreal is a live album by the British rock band Queen. It was released on 29 October 2007 as a double CD, Blu-ray, DVD, and triple vinyl in the UK and the following day in the US.

It was recorded in Montreal, Quebec, at the Montreal Forum on 24 November and 25 November 1981, ten years before lead singer Freddie Mercury died of AIDS. AllMusic described Queen's performance as being "deliberately theatrical and often majestic".

This marks the first official release of the film soundtrack to the concert film We Will Rock You on an audio-only format. Unlike the original video release of We Will Rock You, which has been re-released as Queen Rock Montreal, the album and CD features the full show (including "Flash" and "The Hero") fully remixed.

Track listing

Disc one
 "Intro" – 1:59
 "We Will Rock You (Fast)" (Brian May) – 3:06
 "Let Me Entertain You" (Freddie Mercury) – 2:48
 "Play the Game" (Mercury) – 3:57
 "Somebody to Love" (Mercury) – 7:53
 "Killer Queen" (Mercury) – 1:59
 "I'm in Love with My Car" (Roger Taylor) – 2:03
 "Get Down, Make Love" (Mercury) – 4:45
 "Save Me" (May) – 4:14
 "Now I'm Here" (May) – 5:31
 "Dragon Attack" (May) – 3:11
 "Now I'm Here (Reprise)" (May) – 1:53
 "Love of My Life" (Mercury) – 3:56

Disc two
 "Under Pressure" (Queen, David Bowie) – 3:49
 "Keep Yourself Alive" (May) – 3:29
 "Drum and Tympani Solo" (Taylor) – 3:00
 "Guitar Solo" (May) – 5:11
 "Flash" (May) * – 2:11
 "The Hero" (May) * – 1:51
 "Crazy Little Thing Called Love" (Mercury) – 4:15
 "Jailhouse Rock" (Jerry Leiber, Mike Stoller) – 2:32
 "Bohemian Rhapsody" (Mercury) – 5:28
 "Tie Your Mother Down" (May) – 3:52
 "Another One Bites the Dust" (John Deacon) – 4:00
 "Sheer Heart Attack" (Taylor) – 3:53
 "We Will Rock You" (May) – 2:09
 "We Are the Champions" (Mercury) – 3:27
 "God Save the Queen" (traditional) (arr. May) – 1:27

* previously unreleased

Personnel
Freddie Mercury - lead vocals, piano, acoustic guitar on "Crazy Little Thing Called Love", tambourine on "Keep Yourself Alive"
Brian May - guitars, vocals, piano on "Save Me" and "Flash", synthesizer on "Flash"
Roger Taylor - drums, percussion, vocals, lead vocal on "I'm in Love with My Car" and "Another One Bites The Dust" (chorus), synthesizer on "Intro" 
John Deacon - bass guitar, vocals
Josh Macrae - mix producer
Justin Shirley-Smith - mix producer
Kris Fredriksson - Pro Tools HD
Reinhold Mack - recording engineer
Kevin Metcalfe	 - mastering
Richard Gray - artwork

Charts

Certifications and sales

References

External links
Official site

Queen (band) live albums
2007 live albums
Hollywood Records live albums
Parlophone live albums
Albums recorded at the Montreal Forum